The 2021–22 season was the 120th season of competitive football in Italy.

National teams

Men

Italy national football team

Friendlies

2021 UEFA Nations League Finals

2022 FIFA World Cup qualification

Group C

Second round

UEFA Euro 2020

Knockout phase

Final

2022 Finalissima

UEFA Nations League

Group 3

Women

Italy women's national football team

Friendlies

2023 FIFA Women's World Cup qualification

Group G

2022 Algarve Cup

Final

League season

Men

Promotions and relegations (pre-season)
Teams promoted to Serie A
Empoli
Salernitana
Venezia
Teams relegated from Serie A
Benevento
Parma
Crotone

Teams promoted to Serie B
Como (Group A)
Perugia (Group B)
Ternana (Group C)
Alessandria (Play-Off Winner)

Teams relegated from Serie B
Chievo (excluded)
Reggiana
Pescara
Virtus Entella

Serie A

Serie B

Serie C

Serie D

Women

Serie A (women)

Cup competitions

Coppa Italia

Final

Supercoppa Italiana

Coppa Italia Serie C

Coppa Italia Serie D

Coppa Italia (women)

Final

Supercoppa Italiana (women)

Final

UEFA competitions

UEFA Champions League

Group stage

Group B

Group D

Group F

Group H

Knockout phase

Round of 16

|}

UEFA Europa League

Group stage

Group C

Group E

Knockout stage

Knockout round play-offs

|}

Round of 16

|}

Quarter-finals

|}

UEFA Europa Conference League

Qualifying phase and play-off round

Play-off round

|}

Group stage

Group C

Knockout stage

Round of 16

|}

Quarter-finals

|}

Semi-finals

|}

Final

UEFA Youth League

UEFA Champions League Path

Group B

Group D

Group F

Group H

Domestic Champions Path

First round

|}

Second round

|}

Play-offs

Knockout round play-offs

|}

Round of 16

|}

Quarter-finals

|}

Semi-finals

|}

UEFA Women's Champions League

Qualifying rounds

Round 1

Semi-finals

|}

Final

|}

Round 2

|}

Group stage

Group A

Knockout phase

Quarter-finals

|}

Notes

References 

 
Seasons in Italian football
Football
Football
Italy
Italy
2021 sport-related lists